Shunsuke Kikuchi (菊地 俊介, born 4 October 1991 in Saitama, Saitama, Japan)  is a Japanese football player for Ehime FC in J3 League from 2023.

Career
Kikuchi begin first youth career with Inagakuen Public High School
from 2007 until 2009 and entered to Nippon Sport Science University from 2010 until he was graduation in 2013.

Kikuchi begin first professional career with Shonan Bellmare from 2014. Kikuchi leave from the club after six years at Shonan.

On 30 December 2019, Kikuchi joined J2 club, Omiya Ardija from 2020. On 14 November 2022, Omiya announced Kikuchi contract had been expired and would not be renewed for next season.

On 27 December at same year, Kikuchi announcement officially transfer to J3 club, Ehime FC for upcoming 2023 season.

Career statistics
Updated to the 2022 season.

Club

Honours

Shonan Bellmare
J2 League (2): 2014, 2017
J.League Cup (1): 2018

References

External links

 Profile at Shonan Bellmare
 

1991 births
Living people
Nippon Sport Science University alumni
Association football people from Saitama Prefecture
Japanese footballers
J1 League players
J2 League players
Shonan Bellmare players
Omiya Ardija players
Association football midfielders
Universiade bronze medalists for Japan
Universiade medalists in football
Medalists at the 2013 Summer Universiade